Govinda Govinda may refer to:
 Govinda Govinda (1994 film), a Telugu-language supernatural thriller film
 Govinda Govinda (2021 film), an Indian Kannada comedy thriller film